Scale Venture Partners is an early-stage venture capital firm that typically leads Series A or Series B rounds. Over the last 20 years, Scale has made over 380 investments in Cloud, SaaS and Infrastructure companies, with over 159 exits, including IPOs for companies like Bill.com, Box, DocuSign, HubSpot, RingCentral, Root Insurance, and WalkMe.

Scale believes that innovations in Cloud, AI, machine learning, and data are combining to transform enterprise software and infrastructure through what the company calls "Cognitive Applications". Today, Scale continues to make early investments in markets like DataOps, DevOps, Digital Health, Fintech, Infrastructure, Open Source, Productivity, Vertical SaaS, Security, and AI-enabled apps.

Scale offers a Scaling Platform that uses executive networks, go-to-market playbooks, private communities, and Scale Studio benchmarks to help startups founder-led growth to a repeatable go-to-market machine.

Scale launched a data-product, Scale Studio, in 2018 to analyze and benchmark SaaS-metrics “Vital Signs” like: growth, efficiency, churn and burn.

Scale is based in Foster City, California.

History 
The firm was founded in 2000 as BA Venture Partners, and functioned as the venture capital arm of Bank of America, where it raised its first two funds.

In 2007, the firm spun out from Bank of America and changed its name to Scale Venture Partners. Scale's $600 million Fund VII was launched in December 2020.

SaaS and cloud investments 
Scale invests in enterprise software startups that are between $500,000  $5,000,000 in annual revenue, within SaaS and Cloud, Scale focuses on markets like: AI and ML, productivity, open source, cybersecurity, dev-ops, big data and automation for industries that have traditionally been low-tech.

Investments of note include:

 BigID
 Bill.com
 Box.com
 CircleCI
 CloudHealth
 DemandBase
 Docusign
 ExactTarget
 Expel
 Forter
 Honeycomb
 Hubspot
 JFrog
 KeepTruckin
 Locus Robotics
 Omniture
 OneLogin
 Papaya Global
 PerimiterX
 RingCentral
 Root
 Scout RFP
 Socure
 Spruce
 Treasure Data
 WalkMe
 Wrike

Scale Studio  SaaS metrics and benchmarks 
Scale Studio is a free data-product that launched in July 2018 that analyzes financials and operating metrics from 1000+ private companies and provides SaaS-metrics and benchmarks for startup “Vital Signs” like: growth, efficiency, churn and burn.

The platform asks users to input their financial and operational data, and then produces a report which benchmarks performance against thousands of quarters of data from similar companies.

References

External links 
 

Financial services companies established in 2000
Venture capital firms of the United States
Companies based in Foster City, California